South Shropshire was, between 1974 and 2009, a local government district in south west Shropshire, England.

South Shropshire was the most rural district of one of the UK's most rural counties, the population of the district was 40,410 in 2001 spread out over 1,027 km2 of forest, mountains, moorlands, hills and mixed quality farmland. It bordered the unitary authority of Powys in Wales, which it closely resembled, economically, socially, culturally and historically. 65% of the district is part of the Shropshire Hills Area of Outstanding Natural Beauty. The towns in the district were Ludlow, Church Stretton, Cleobury Mortimer, Clun, Bishop's Castle and Craven Arms.

The district was formed by the merger of the rural districts of Clun and Bishop's Castle and Ludlow in 1974, under the Local Government Act 1972.

The district and its council were abolished on 1 April 2009 when the new Shropshire unitary authority was established, as part of the 2009 structural changes to local government in England.

History
South Shropshire had many ancient monuments, with Mitchells Fold on the Welsh border being the most notable, and there is evidence of Neolithic quarrying in the Apedale.
The area seems to have been settled by the Ordovices, an Iron Age tribe of people in the last millennium BC, and was a stronghold of the Celtic chieftain Caractacus (Caer Caradoc is said to be named after him). The area was probably part of the "Military" division of the Roman occupation and locals claim that the Romans mined lead in the north west of the district.

In the Early Middle Ages, the area was a battleground between the Welsh and the Anglo Saxon Kingdom of Mercia and Offa's Dyke, which is partially in the district, is a permanent reminder of the areas border status. In the Middle Ages, South Shropshire was part of the Welsh Marches, a lawless area ruled by tyrannical feudal lords, who as Marcher Lords had de facto independence from the King of England.

During the English Civil War the area was generally spared from fighting, although there was a small massacre at Hopton Castle and Ludlow Castle was captured by Parliamentary troops.

During the Industrial Revolution, coal was mined around Clee Hill and lead was mined near the border with Wales, e.g. at Snailbeach. Church Stretton was a centre of textile manufacture and Ludlow thrived on the malting trade, while the rest of the area was populated by smallholders. The economy of the area was fragile, and most industry in the area had collapsed by 1900.

The administrative area of South Shropshire was created on 1 April 1974 under the Local Government Act 1972 as one of six non-metropolitan districts within Shropshire. It covered the area of two former districts:
 Clun and Bishop's Castle Rural District (which included the rural borough of Bishop's Castle)
 Ludlow Rural District (which included the rural borough of Ludlow)

The district and its council were abolished on 31 March 2009, with the area becoming part of the new Shropshire Council unitary authority from 1 April 2009, as part of the 2009 structural changes to local government in England.

Geography

South Shropshire included mountains, valleys, hills, moors, forests and low grade farmland. The landscape is often rugged, with crags and rock outcrops very common, especially in the west and around the Clee Hills, and was for the most part gouged by glaciers during the ice age. The area's many rock types made it particularly interesting to geologists, with Wenlock Edge being especially noteworthy.

See the Shropshire Hills AONB (Area of Outstanding Natural Beauty) for more about the natural geography of the area.

Economics and demographics
Economically the district was largely dependent on tourism, partly due to the decline in the economic significance of farming and also the decline and subsequent end of local lead and coal mining industry.  In addition to tourism, some light industry did exist in the district, in the Church Stretton and Ludlow areas, and in Burford, near Tenbury Wells.

Additionally, the local demographics show a large economic gap between affluent residents and poorer communities.  Many of the affluent residents have moved into the area from other places, such as South East England on their retirement. This continues an older trend whose root was initially in the imbalance of wealth associated with the farming economy previously prevalent in the area.

Energy policy
In May 2006, a report commissioned by British Gas  showed that housing in South Shropshire produced the 13th highest average carbon emissions in the country at 7,156 kg of carbon dioxide per dwelling.

Political control
The first elections to the council were held in 1973, initially operating as a shadow authority until the new arrangements came into effect on 1 April 1974. Political control of the council from 1974 until its abolition in 2009 was held by the following parties:

Leadership
The leaders of the council from 2003 until its abolition in 2009 were:

Council elections
1973 South Shropshire District Council election
1976 South Shropshire District Council election (New ward boundaries)
1979 South Shropshire District Council election
1983 South Shropshire District Council election
1987 South Shropshire District Council election (District boundary changes took place but the number of seats remained the same)
1991 South Shropshire District Council election
1995 South Shropshire District Council election
1999 South Shropshire District Council election
2003 South Shropshire District Council election (New ward boundaries)
2007 South Shropshire District Council election

By-election results

References

Council elections in Shropshire
District council elections in England
Districts of England established in 1974
English districts abolished in 2009
Former non-metropolitan districts of Shropshire